Jeevan is an Indian sub-continent first name meaning 'life' or 'bringer of life', that may be used by males or females. The name originates from the Sanskrit language but is more often used as a Nepalese language name, a Sikh or a Hindu name. Alternative spellings are Geevan, Gevan, Jiivan, Jeevan Prabhat Jaivan, Givan, Jevan, Jamaliya, Jamal, Jivanshi or Jivan. The name may refer to:

People 
 Jeevan (actor) (1915–1987), Indian actor
Jeevan (Tamil actor)
 Jeevan Mendis (born 1983), Sri Lankan cricketer
 Jeevan Nalge (born 1989), Indian football player
 Jevan Snead (born 1987), American football player
 Jeevan Thondaman (born 1994), Sri Lankan politician

Indian unisex given names